Vellacci or Vellachi Nachiyar (1770-1793) was the second ruling queen of Sivaganga estate in 1790–1793. She is the daughter of Muthu Vaduganatha Periyavudaya Thevar and Velu Nachiyar. She was made the heir to the throne of Sivagangai by her mother Velu Nachiyar after the recapture of Sivagangai from the East India Company.

References 

Indian female royalty
Tamil history
Tamil monarchs
18th-century women rulers